Slesinger is a German surname. Notable people with the surname include: 

 Bruce Slesinger, drummer with the punk music band Dead Kennedys
 Stephen Slesinger (1901–1953), American radio/television/film producer and comic book character creator

See also 
 Schlesinger
 Schlessinger
 Shlesinger

Germanic-language surnames
German-language surnames
Jewish surnames
Surnames of Silesian origin
Yiddish-language surnames